Emil Omert (15 January 1918 – 24 April 1944) was a German Luftwaffe ace and recipient of the Knight's Cross of the Iron Cross during World War II. Omert claimed 70 aerial victories in over 700 missions, including 125 fighter-bomber and ground attack mission. He also claimed 25 aircraft destroyed on the ground. Emil Omert was awarded the Knight's Cross on 19 March 1942 for 50 victories. The Knight's Cross of the Iron Cross was awarded to recognise extreme battlefield bravery or successful military leadership.

Career
Omert was bon on 15 January 1918 in Ginolfs, present-day part of Oberelsbach, at the time in the Kingdom of Bavaria within the German Empire. Following flight training, he was posted to the II. Gruppe (2nd group) of Jagdgeschwader 3 (JG 3—3rd Fighter Wing) on 1 February 1940. He was then transferred to the 4. Staffel (4th squadron) of Jagdgeschwader 2 "Richthofen" (JG 2—2nd Fighter Wing) before he was again transferred to 8. Staffel of Jagdgeschwader 77 (JG 77—77th Fighter Wing) in late 1940.

Eastern Front
In preparation for Operation Barbarossa, the German invasion of the Soviet Union, III. Gruppe was moved to Bucharest and was located in the sector of Heeresgruppe Süd (Army Group South). III. Gruppe arrived in Bucharest on 16 June. Four days later, III. Gruppe moved to Roman.

By end-1941, Omert had increased his total number of aerial victories to 39 claims. On 10 February 1942, Omert was appointed Staffelkapitän of 8. Staffel of JG 77, replacing Leutnant Wilhelm Schopper in this capacity.

Mediterranean Theater and Romania
On 23 October 1942, the British Eighth Army launched the Second Battle of El Alamein. Preceding this attack, the Luftwaffe had already planned to replace Jagdgeschwader 27 (JG 27—27th Fighter Wing), which had been fighting in North African theater, with JG 77. In preparation for this rotation, III. Gruppe of JG 77 was moved to Munich on 19 October where it was equipped with the Bf 109 G-2/trop. On 23 and 24 October, the Gruppe moved to Bari in southern Italy. The Gruppe then relocated to Tobruk Airfield on 26 October. The following day, the Gruppe moved to an airfield at Tanyet-Harun.

On 31 January 1943, Omert claimed two Curtiss P-40 Warhawk fighters near Kebili and El Hamma. On 13 July, Omert was shot down and wounded in his Messerschmitt Bf 109 G-6 (Werknummer 18447—factory number) in aerial combat with Lockheed P-38 Lightning fighters resulting in an emergency landing north-northeast of Enna. During his convalescence, he was temporarily replaced by Oberleutnant Helmut Hänsel.

When on 10 March 1944, Major Kurt Ubben, the commander of III. Gruppe of JG 77 was transferred, Omert was appointed Gruppenkommandeur (group commander) of III. Gruppe. At the time, Omert at the time was still with II. Gruppe of JG 77 and in consequence, III. Gruppe was briefly led by Hauptmann Karl Bresoschek. Omert was killed in action on 24 April 1944 after attacking USAAF four engine bombers over Finta Mare, Romania. He bailed out of his Bf 109 G-6 (Werknummer 160826) and was then shot and killed by marauding US fighter aircraft while hanging in his parachute. Command of III. Gruppe was then again given to Bresoschek, and later to Oberleutnant Erhard Niese, before Major Armin Köhler took command on 1 August 1944.

Summary of career

Aerial victory claims
According to US historian David T. Zabecki, Omert was credited with 70 aerial victories. Spick also lists him with 70 aerial victories, 50 on the Eastern Front, 3 in the Mediterranean theater and 17 on the Western Front, claimed in approximately 700 combat missions. Mathews and Foreman, authors of Luftwaffe Aces — Biographies and Victory Claims, researched the German Federal Archives and found documentation for 55 aerial victory claims, plus ten further unconfirmed claims. This number includes 42 claims on the Eastern Front and 13 on the Western Front, including two four-engined bombers.

Victory claims were logged to a map-reference (PQ = Planquadrat), for example "PQ 3744". These sectors were then subdivided into 36 smaller units to give a location area 3 × 4 km in size.

Awards
 Flugzeugführerabzeichen
 Front Flying Clasp of the Luftwaffe
 Iron Cross (1939)
 2nd Class
 1st Class
 Honour Goblet of the Luftwaffe on 25 January 1942 as Leutnant and pilot
 Knight's Cross of the Iron Cross on 19 March 1942 as Leutnant and pilot in the III./Jagdgeschwader 77
 German Cross in Gold on 17 February 1943 as Oberleutnant in the I./Jagdgeschwader 77

Notes

References

Citations

Bibliography

 
 
 
 
 
 
 
 
 
 
 
 
 
 
 
 
 
 
 
 
 
 

1918 births
1944 deaths
Luftwaffe pilots
German World War II flying aces
Recipients of the Gold German Cross
Recipients of the Knight's Cross of the Iron Cross
Luftwaffe personnel killed in World War II
Aviators killed by being shot down
People from Rhön-Grabfeld
Military personnel from Bavaria